Time is the fourth studio album of Chinese singer Bibi Zhou, released on July 8, 2009.

Track listing
 "Season" – 4:42
 "These Words" (这句话) – 3:51
 "Your Love" (你们的爱) – 4:34
 "Reversed Time" (倒叙的时光) – 4:11
 "Favor" (青睐) – 4:23
 "An Apple Bitten by God" (上帝咬过的苹果) – 4:07
 "Sing Half a Song" (唱一半的歌) – 3:58
 "Learning to Feel" (学会感觉) – 3:58
 "Sleepwalking While Awake" (醒着梦游) – 4:50
 "Sing Out Happiness" (唱响幸福) – 3:22

2009 albums
Bibi Zhou albums

vi:Time